Lakeman is a surname. Notable people with the surname include:

Al Lakeman (1918–1976), catcher in Major League Baseball
Enid Lakeman, OBE (1903–1995), British political reformer, writer and politician
Jan Lakeman, mid 20th century Labour rights activist and former leader of the provincial Communist Party in Alberta, Canada
Sam Lakeman (born 1975), English musician, songwriter, and producer and co-owner of Charcoal Records
Sean Lakeman (born 1974), English folk musician and producer
Seth Lakeman (born 1977), English folk singer, songwriter, and multi-instrumentalist
Stephen Bartlett Lakeman (1823–1897), English-born British and Ottoman adventurer, soldier, and administrator
The Lakeman Brothers, folk music trio from England, consisting of Sean Lakeman, Sam Lakeman and Seth Lakeman
Thomas Lakeman (born 1964), the author of three mystery novels published by St. Martin's Minotaur

See also
Heard-Lakeman House, built in 1776, is a historic house at 2 Turkey Shore Road in Ipswich, Massachusetts